"Sealed with a Kiss" is a song written and composed by Peter Udell and Gary Geld. It first became a hit in 1962 for Brian Hyland. The original recording of "Sealed with a Kiss" was by the Four Voices which was released as a single in May 1960 without becoming a hit. Jason Donovan later had an international number one hit with the song.

The lyrics are from the point of view of one of two lovers who have had to part ways over the summer. The narrator promises the lover who has had to leave that he will send his love and dreams in daily letters "sealed with a kiss".  The two also bind each other to a pledge, under seal of a kiss, that they will reunite in September.

Brian Hyland version

In 1962, Brian Hyland, who often performed Udell's and Geld's material, covered the song. Hyland recalls Geld saying the song was "based on, but not totally based on, a Bach finger exercise." (See Five-finger exercise.) Hyland's single began its run on June 9, 1962, and became a top 3 hit, reaching No. 3 on both the Billboard Hot 100 and the UK Singles Chart. The personnel on the original Brian Hyland recording included Mundell Lowe, Al Caiola on guitar, Gary Geld on piano, George Duvivier on bass, Blackie Shackner on harmonica, Gary Chester on drums, and Sticks Evans and Al Rogers on percussion.

When re-released in 1975, Hyland's recording charted in the UK at No. 7. Hyland also recorded a version in German.

Charts

Gary Lewis and the Playboys version

Gary Lewis & the Playboys covered the song in 1967 on the album Gary Lewis Now!. Their cover version of the single was a Billboard Hot 100 No. 19 hit.

Charts

Bobby Vinton version

A third top 40 Hot 100 version came in 1972, when Bobby Vinton released his interpretation as a single. It reached No. 19 on the Billboard singles chart. This version also placed high on the Billboard Adult Contemporary chart (No. 2). Vinton arranged the song himself, with a modern sound including a unique bongo opening that made the song stand out from the other recordings. The success of the single led to Vinton releasing an album, also titled Sealed with a Kiss, that charted as a best seller. This single, which was a follow up to "Every Day of My Life", marked a Vinton comeback in 1971, with the artist appearing on American Bandstand and other television shows on the strength of the single. Billboard ranked it as the No. 87 song for 1971.

Vinton's recording was used in both the trailer and the end credits of the 2007 horror film All the Boys Love Mandy Lane.

Charts

Jason Donovan version

On May 29, 1989, Australian singer and actor Jason Donovan released a cover version of "Sealed with a Kiss" as the fourth single from his debut album, Ten Good Reasons (1989). His version went straight into the UK Singles Chart at No. 1 and stayed there for two weeks, also reaching the top in Finland and Ireland.

Critical reception
Bill Coleman from Billboard wrote, "Dreamy rendition of the Bobby Vinton oldie has the potential to provide Aussie-bred, U.K.-based pop star with a long-awaited stateside hit." Tom Doyle from Smash Hits said, "It actually does sound like a record made in the '60s and not at all like any of the other records in the charts, which should help it get played a lot on the radio. "A future number one!" as Bruno Brookes would chirrup cheerfully."

Charts

Weekly charts

Year-end charts

Notable cover versions

 Swedish rock band Hounds covered the song in 1967, in a version which reached number 4 on Kvällstoppen and 2 on Tio i Topp.
 American R&B all-girl trio the Toys covered it in 1968, on the Musicor label, where it reached No. 43 on the U.S. R&B charts.

References

Songs about kissing
Songs about parting
Songs with music by Gary Geld
Songs with lyrics by Peter Udell
1960 singles
1962 singles
1968 singles
1972 singles
1989 singles
Song recordings produced by Stock Aitken Waterman
Brian Hyland songs
Gary Lewis & the Playboys songs
Bobby Vinton songs
Jason Donovan songs
The Lettermen songs
The Toys songs
Bobby Vee songs
Mud (band) songs
The Shadows songs
Agnetha Fältskog songs
Chris de Burgh songs
Shelley Fabares songs
Spanky and Our Gang songs
UK Singles Chart number-one singles
UK Independent Singles Chart number-one singles
The Flying Pickets songs
Epic Records singles
Pete Waterman Entertainment singles
Columbia Records singles
ABC Records singles
Paramount Records singles
Liberty Records singles
1960 songs